The 2017–18 Youth League U18 (formerly known as I-League U18) was the tenth season of the Indian Youth League U18 and the third season of the competition as an under-18 one. AIFF announced that the zonal rounds for the league that started from 20 November 2017 in Chennai, Maharashtra, Kolkata and Delhi. AIFF Elite Academy were three-time defending champions, but did not participate in the tournament. Shillong Lajong won their first title by defeating Kerala Blasters 2–0 in the final on 26 May 2018.

Qualifiers

Kolkata zone

Zonal round

Delhi zone

Kolkata zone

Maharashtra zone

Chennai–Karnataka zone

Shillong–Guwahati zone

Goa zone

Rest of India zone

Group A

Group B
All matches played at Minerva Training Ground, Ludhiana.

Group C

Group D
All matches played at Panampally Ground, Kochi.

Playoffs

Group A
All matches played at Jawaharlal Nehru Stadium (Shillong).

Group B
All matches played at MFA Turf, Shillong.

Final round

Group A

Group B

Group C

Group D

Knockout stage

Bracket

Semi-finals

Final

Top scorers

References

External links
 I-League U18 on the AIFF website.

Youth League U18
2017–18 in Indian football